The Open Road is an album by John Hiatt, released in 2010 through the record label New West.

Track listing
 "The Open Road" – 4:34
 "Haulin'" – 4:07
 "Go Down Swingin'" – 3:40
 "Like a Freight Train" – 6:00
 "My Baby" – 4:12
 "Homeland" – 4:47
 "Wonder of Love" – 3:53
 "What Kind of Man" – 3:52
 "Movin' On" – 4:44
 "Fireball Roberts" – 4:28
 "Carry You Back Home" – 3:36

Personnel
Kenneth Blevins - drums
John Hiatt - acoustic and electric guitar, vocals
Doug Lancio - electric guitar
Patrick O'Hearn - bass

References

2010 albums
John Hiatt albums
New West Records albums